Viktor Sharygin (9 October 1949 – 1991) was a Russian swimmer who won a bronze medal at the 1974 European Aquatics Championships. He also competed at the 1968 and 1972 Summer Olympics and finished fourth in the 4 × 100 m medley (1972) and seventh in the 200 m butterfly (1968). Between 1969 and 1974 he set nine national records in butterfly and medley relay events.\
Around 1990 he competed in the masters category and won a national titles in the 100 m butterfly. He died in August 1991 during the 1991 Soviet coup d'état attempt.

References

1949 births
1991 deaths
Swimmers at the 1968 Summer Olympics
Swimmers at the 1972 Summer Olympics
Male butterfly swimmers
Soviet male swimmers
Olympic swimmers of the Soviet Union
European Aquatics Championships medalists in swimming
Universiade medalists in swimming
Universiade silver medalists for the Soviet Union
Universiade bronze medalists for the Soviet Union
Medalists at the 1973 Summer Universiade